Jackson Morton (August 10, 1794 – November 20, 1874) was an American politician. A member of the Whig Party, he represented Florida as a U.S. Senator from 1849 to 1855. He also served as a Deputy from Florida to the Provisional Congress of the Confederate States from 1861 to 1862.

Early life and education
Morton was born in Spotsylvania County, Virginia. He was the brother of Jeremiah Morton, a U.S. Representative from Virginia. Jackson Morton attended Washington College (present-day Washington and Lee University) and the College of William and Mary. He moved to Santa Rosa County, Florida, in 1820 and engaged in the lumber business.

Political career
In 1836, Morton became a member of the Florida Territorial Legislative Council and served as its president in 1837. In 1838, he was a delegate to the state constitutional convention for the first Florida Constitution. He was a United States Navy agent in Pensacola from 1841 to 1845.  In 1848, he was a presidential elector on the Whig Party ticket. Morton was elected to the U.S. Senate in 1848. He served in the Senate from 1849 to 1855 when he was no longer a candidate for reelection and resumed his lumber business.

As the division over slavery grew between northern and southern states, Morton became active in the development of the Confederacy.  On November 30, 1860, he was chosen to represent Santa Rosa County as a delegate of the Florida Secession Convention in Tallahassee.  On January 7, 1861, he was appointed to be part of a twelve-person committee to prepare an Ordinance of Secession for Florida.  Morton and George Taliaferro Ward attempted to have the ordinance amended so that Florida would not secede until Georgia and Alabama seceded and so that popular ratification would be required.  They were overruled on January 8, 1861, and the ordinance went to a vote as planned.  Morton voted in favor of secession and, on January 10, 1861, by a vote of 62–7, Florida became the third state to leave the United States.

On January 17, 1861, Morton was appointed to be a delegate to the Montgomery Convention for constructing a provisional Confederate government. On February 4, 1861, the delegates met and drafted the Provisional Constitution of the Confederate States which was signed by Morton and the rest of the delegates four days later. The delegates at this convention became the Provisional Congress of the Confederate States. He served for the duration of the Provisional Congress and, in the month following the Provisional Constitution, he also signed its successor, the Confederate States Constitution. Morton and Augustus Maxwell were the only people to represent Florida in both the United States Congress and the Confederate States Congress.

Later life and death
Jackson Morton returned to Santa Rosa County and died at his home, "Mortonia", on November 22, 1874. He was interred there in a private cemetery.

See also
 List of slave owners
 List of United States senators from Florida

References

Further reading
  .

External links
 
 Jackson Morton at The Political Graveyard
 

1794 births
1874 deaths
19th-century American politicians
American slave owners
Burials in Florida
College of William & Mary alumni
Deputies and delegates to the Provisional Congress of the Confederate States
Florida Whigs
Members of the Florida Territorial Legislature
People from Spotsylvania County, Virginia
People of Florida in the American Civil War
Signers of the Confederate States Constitution
Signers of the Provisional Constitution of the Confederate States
United States senators from Florida
Washington and Lee University alumni
Whig Party United States senators
United States senators who owned slaves